Saham is a coastal town in the Al Batinah Region, in northeastern Oman. Saham is a fishing and a farming town between Al Khaboura and Sohar.

See also
 List of cities in Oman

References

 
Populated places in Oman
Al Batinah North Governorate